FNAC may refer to:

 Fine-needle aspiration cytology, a diagnostic procedure used to investigate lumps or masses under the skin
 Fnac (Fédération Nationale d’Achats des Cadres), French chain store
 FNAC (rifle), a variant of the FN SCAR assault rifle
 Fonds national d'art contemporain, a public collection of contemporary art in France.